Markus Nurmi (born 29 June 1998) is a Finnish professional ice hockey forward currently playing with the Milwaukee Admirals in the American Hockey League (AHL) as a prospect for the Nashville Predators in the National Hockey League (NHL). He was selected by the Ottawa Senators in the sixth round, 163rd overall, in the 2016 NHL Entry Draft.

Playing career
Nurmi played as a youth within HC TPS organization and made his Finnish Liiga debut with TPS during the 2015–16 season.

Following his seventh season in the Liiga with TPS in 2021–22, Nurmi was signed as a free agent by the Nashville Predators to a one-year, entry-level contract on 10 June 2022.

Career statistics

Regular season and playoffs

International

References

External links
 

1998 births
Living people
Finnish ice hockey forwards
Milwaukee Admirals players
Ottawa Senators draft picks
Sportspeople from Turku
HC TPS players
TuTo players